Aldo De Benedetti (13 August 1892 – 19 January 1970) was an Italian screenwriter. He wrote for more than 110 films between 1920 and 1958. He was born and died in Rome, Italy.

Selected filmography

 Marco Visconti (1925)
 What Scoundrels Men Are! (1932)
 Mr. Desire (1934)
 Just Married (1934)
 The Countess of Parma (1936)
Music in the Square (1936)
 Thirty Seconds of Love (1936)
 Sette giorni all'altro mondo (1936)
 The Last Days of Pompeo (1937)
 The Carnival Is Here Again (1937)
 Mother Song (1937)
 These Children (1937)
 Triumph of Love (1938)
 Nonna Felicità (1938)
 They've Kidnapped a Man (1938)
The House of Shame (1938)
 The Lady in White (1938)
 The Faceless Voice (1939)
 We Were Seven Sisters (1939)
 We Were Seven Widows (1939)
 Unjustified Absence (1939)
 Mille chilometri al minuto (1939)
 Red Roses (1940)
 Red Tavern (1940)
 Two on a Vacation (1940)
 Invisible Chains (1942)
 Labbra serrate (1942)
 Four Steps in the Clouds (1942)
 Stasera niente di nuovo (1942)
 Music on the Run (1943)
 Life Begins Anew (1945)
My Widow and I (1945)
 His Young Wife (1945)
 Departure at Seven (1946)
 A Yank in Rome (1946)
 Adam and the Serpent (1946)
 The White Primrose (1947)
 Twenty Years (1949)
 Chains (1949)
 Little Lady (1949)
 Night Taxi (1950)
 Torment (1950)
 The Merry Widower (1950)
 Nobody's Children (1951)
 Five Paupers in an Automobile (1952)
 Who is Without Sin (1952)
 Lieutenant Giorgio (1952)
 Via Padova 46 (1953)
 Schiava del peccato (1954)
 Orient Express (1954)
 L'ultimo amante (1955)
 The White Angel (1955)
 Eighteen Year Olds (1955)
 Melancholic Autumn (1958)

References

External links

1892 births
1970 deaths
20th-century Italian screenwriters
Italian male screenwriters
20th-century Italian male writers
1970 suicides
Suicides in Italy